Abruzzese is an Italian surname, meaning literally "Abruzzian" or "from Abruzzo". Notable people with the surname include:

 David Abruzzese (born 1969), Welsh footballer
 Giuseppe Abruzzese (born 1981), Italian footballer
 Ray Abruzzese (1937–2011), American football player
 Nick Abruzzese (born 1999), American ice hockey player.

People with a similar surname include:
 Dave Abbruzzese (born 1968), American drummer
 Roberto Abrussezze (born 1948), Brazilian football manager and former player.

References 

Italian-language surnames
Italian toponymic surnames
Ethnonymic surnames